East Gwillimbury is a town (lower-tier municipality) on the East Holland River in the upper-tier municipality the Regional Municipality of York. It is part of the Greater Toronto Area of southern Ontario, in Canada. It was formed by the amalgamation of the Township of East Gwillimbury with all the previously incorporated villages and hamlets within the township. The main centres in East Gwillimbury are the villages of Holland Landing, Queensville, Sharon, and Mount Albert. The Civic Centre (municipal offices) are located along Leslie Street in Sharon. The northernmost interchange of Highway 404 is at the North edge of East Gwillimbury, just south of Ravenshoe Road. The hamlets of Holt and Brown Hill are also within town limits.

East Gwillimbury takes its name from the family of Elizabeth Simcoe, née Gwillim, wife of Sir John Graves Simcoe, the first Lieutenant Governor of Ontario.

Government
The municipal council consists of a mayor and four councillors elected at large, with the mayor also representing the town in York Regional Council. The current and recent mayors are:

Virginia Hackson was elected mayor in the 2010 election, and re-elected in 2014 and 2018.

In the 2018 election, where council was elected for a four-year term, East Gwillimbury's council was elected on the basis of three wards, with two councillors from each ward. The elected councillors were Loralea Carruthers, Terry Foster, Joe Persechini, Tara Roy-Diclemente, Cathy Morton and Scott Crone.

The Federal Member of Parliament is Scot Davidson of the Conservative Party of Canada representing the riding of York—Simcoe, who was elected in a by-election on February 25, 2019.  He replaced Peter Van Loan, who retired as of September 30, 2018.

The Member of Provincial Parliament is Caroline Mulroney, a member of the Progressive Conservative Party of Ontario, representing the provincial riding of York—Simcoe, who won the seat in the 2018 provincial election.

Emergency services
There are three fire and emergency services locations, in Holland Landing, Mount Albert and Queensville.  They are each staffed by a District Fire Chief and volunteer firefighters.

Police services are provided by the York Regional Police.

Planning
In March, 2006 the town council passed a policy during the Committee of the Whole Council Meeting which requires all residential developments of at least ten units to comply with Energy Star qualifications. The town's mayor described potential benefits of the program: "Energy efficient housing is the best way to ensure that East Gwillimbury's residents are insulated against rising energy costs and won't have to make costly energy efficiency upgrade retrofits in the future." The program was developed in conjunction with the development community, and stipulates "that homes in new subdivisions must — emphasis here on must — have some of the most efficient hot water, heating and air conditioning systems, be upgraded with top-rated insulation, and have draft-proof windows."

East Gwillimbury is the first jurisdiction in Canada to require Energy Star certification for residential units.

The 2010 Official Plan
In June 2010, town council passed the Official Plan for the Town of East Gwillimbury. The Official Plan was praised for its consultations
with the public, developers, and other stakeholders. Designated as a future growth area under the Places to Grow Act by the Province of Ontario, East Gwillimbury will see growth from 23,000 residents in 2010, to approximately 88,400 people and 34,000 jobs by the year 2031. Despite the large amount of growth, almost 75% of East Gwillimbury land will not be developed as it is part of both the Greenbelt and the Oak Ridges Moraine. Rather than being spread out throughout the town, growth will be concentrated in the existing villages of Holland Landing, Sharon, Queensville and Mount Albert. Queensville will see the most growth, going from a population of 650 people in 2010, to over 30,000 residents. Much of the growth has been proposed since the early 1990s – however, growth in East Gwillimbury cannot occur until the York–Durham Sewage System is extended into the town, which has been postponed until 2012 or 2013, when costs are lowered. In October 2011, the Regional Municipality of York advised the Ontario Municipal Board, that they support the Official Plan for East Gwillimbury.

Demographics

Attractions
The Sharon Temple is located in the village of Sharon, Ontario.  It was designated as a National Historic Site of Canada in 1990. The site is composed of eight distinctive heritage buildings and dwellings, and houses 6,000 artifacts on a  site. The Temple was constructed between 1825 and 1831 by the "Children of Peace", a Quaker sect led by David Willson, on whose property it was built.

Bare Oaks Family Naturist Park is a naturist (nudist) park located between the villages of Sharon and Mount Albert. It attracts thousands of visitors to East Gwillimbury and has a significant economic impact on area tourism. It has been in that location since 1972 when it was known as the Toronto Helios Society.

Stardust Drive-In Theatre on Mount Albert Road opened in 1950s as North York Drive-In and is one of a handful of drive-in theatres remaining in Canada.

Education

Schools in East Gwillimbury are governed by the York Region District School Board and the York Catholic District School Board. There are several elementary schools. Under the public system, the school board operates Holland Landing Public School, Park Avenue Public School, located in Holland Landing and Phoebe Gilman Public School in the Harvest Hills neighborhood. Sharon Public School, Queensville Public School and Mt. Albert Public School are located in Sharon, Queensville and Mount Albert respectively. The York Catholic District School Board operates Good Shepherd Catholic School (Holland Landing and Our Lady of Good Counsel Catholic Elementary School in Sharon). There are currently no secondary schools in East Gwillimbury, so students in Holland Landing attend Dr. John M. Denison Secondary School in Newmarket and students from Sharon, Queensville and Mount Albert attend Huron Heights Secondary School, also in Newmarket or Stouffville District Secondary School located in Whitchurch-Stouffville. Good Shepherd and Our Lady of Good Counsel students may proceed to Sacred Heart Catholic High School for secondary school. No post-secondary campuses are located in East Gwillimbury, though there are plans to bring a post-secondary institution to the Queensville area. East Gwillimbury's newest public school, Robert Munsch Public School, opened in 2014 in Mount Albert.

Transportation
Local public transportation is provided by York Region Transit, who operate bus services to Sharon, Holland Landing and Mount Albert. GO Transit also offers commuter train and bus services to Toronto through its East Gwillimbury Station on the Barrie line.

Ontario Highway 404 has been extended to just south of Keswick in the Town of Georgina, passing through East Gwillimbury. The town is served by three interchanges along Highway 404, namely Green Lane just north of Newmarket, Queensville Sideroad, and Woodbine Ave at the north end.

History
East Gwillimbury began with the early development of Upper Canada by Lieutenant-Governor John Graves Simcoe in the late 18th century. On his order, Yonge Street was constructed from Lake Ontario to what is now the village of Holland Landing in East Gwillimbury. The areas to the north and east were named East Gwillimbury and North Gwillimbury in honour of Simcoe's wife, Elizabeth Gwillim.  In 1849 the Baldwin Act incorporated the Township of East Gwillimbury effective January 1, 1850. The Province of Ontario incorporated the Town of East Gwillimbury effective January 1, 1971.

As the East Gwillimbury area grew, a number of communities developed. They were the villages or hamlets of Brown Hill, Franklin, Holland Landing, Holt (formerly Eastville), Mount Albert, Queensville (formerly colloquially known as The Four Corners), Ravenshoe, River Drive, and Sharon (formerly Hope).

In 1913, all township records were destroyed in a fire at the clerk's office in Queensville.

Notable people
William S. Beaton, former mayor of Sudbury
Sam Bennett, NHL player with the Florida Panthers
John Candy, actor and comedian
Ebenezer Doan, master builder of Sharon Temple
Samuel Lount, organizer of the 1837 Upper Canada Rebellion
Curtis Joseph, retired NHL goalie
Guy Paul Morin, wrongly convicted
David Willson, founder of the Children of Peace

See also

List of townships in Ontario

References

Further reading

External links

 
Lower-tier municipalities in Ontario
Towns in Ontario